Vinci Vogue Anžlovar (born October 19, 1963, Ljubljana, Slovenia) is a well known Slovenian film director. He has directed Grandma Goes South, the first full-length film in the independent Slovenia. In 2009, he was awarded the media award Victor for his movie The Gorjanci Vampire (Gorjanci being a mountain range in Southeastern Slovenia).

Filmography
 1991 - Babica gre na jug (Grandma Goes South)
 1993 - Gypsy Eyes
 2001 - Poker
 2008 - Vampir z Gorjancev (The Gorjanci Vampire)

References

External links
 Anzlovar's blog (in Slovenian)
 Official The Gorjanci Vampyre blog (in Slovenian)
 Film production page (in Slovenian)

1963 births
Living people
Slovenian film directors
Film people from Ljubljana